Yury Petrov or Yuri Petrov may refer to:

Yury Petrov (politician, born 1939) (1939—2013), Soviet and Russian politician
Yury Petrov (politician, born 1947), Russian politician
, Russian historian
, Russian politician
Yury Petrov (ice hockey) (born 1984), Russian ice hockey player 
Yuri Petrov (born 1974), Russian footballer